Steinfurt I – Borken I is an electoral constituency (German: Wahlkreis) represented in the Bundestag. It elects one member via first-past-the-post voting. Under the current constituency numbering system, it is designated as constituency 124. It is located in northern North Rhine-Westphalia, comprising the western part of Steinfurt district and the eastern part of Borken district.

Steinfurt I – Borken I was created for the 2002 federal election. Since 2002, it has been represented by Jens Spahn of the Christian Democratic Union (CDU).

Geography
Steinfurt I – Borken I is located in northern North Rhine-Westphalia. As of the 2021 federal election, it comprises the municipalities of Horstmar, Metelen, Neuenkirchen, Ochtrup, Rheine, Steinfurt, and Wettringen from Steinfurt district, and the municipalities of Ahaus, Gronau, Heek, Legden, and Schöppingen from Borken district.

History
Steinfurt I – Borken I was created in 2002. Until the 2013 election, it was constituency 125 in the numbering system.

Members
The constituency has been held by Jens Spahn of the Christian Democratic Union (CDU) since its creation. When he was first elected in 2002, Spahn was the youngest member of the Bundestag.

Election results

2021 election

2017 election

2013 election

2009 election

References

Federal electoral districts in North Rhine-Westphalia
2002 establishments in Germany
Constituencies established in 2002
Steinfurt (district)
Borken (district)